The LeBleu Settlement includes areas extending over both Calcasieu and Jefferson Davis Parishes. It is named after the first residents of present-day Lake Charles, Martin and Dela Lebleu; in 1781 the LeBleus first arrived in Lake Charles and settled six miles east of the city.

Acadiana